Matin Rahman is a Bangladeshi film director. He is also known for being a film writer and actor. His debut film was Lal Kajol. In 1993, he won Bangladesh National Film Awards as the Best Director for the film Andho Biswas.

Early life 
Matin Rahman was born on 18 March 1952 in Naogaon District. He is the eldest  of seven brothers and two sisters. He spent his childhood in and graduation from Santahar village. Later in 1973, he came to Dhaka for the study from Alamgir Kabir Film Institute. He is the first student to complete master's degree from journalism.

Since 2004, Rahman has taught at Stamford University Bangladesh. He received a Ph.D. in cinema from Jahangirnagar University in 2019, for a thesis entitled "Applied technique and perception of folk material of Bangladeshi film".

Personal life 
Matin Rahman is married to Nasima Khanam. They live in Mohammadpur, Dhaka. They have two daughters, Naushin and Naurin, and one son Mrittik Rahman.

Filmography

Awards

References

External links
 

1952 births
Living people
Bangladeshi film directors
Best Director National Film Award (Bangladesh) winners
People from Naogaon District